Luiz Fernando Pontes Ribeiro (born 21 December 1977 in  Rio de Janeiro), known as Luizinho, is a Brazilian football player.

Luizinho also played for De Graafschap, FC Groningen and Le Havre before signed two-year contract with VVV-Venlo.

External links

CBF Contract Record 

1982 births
Living people
Brazilian footballers
Le Havre AC players
VVV-Venlo players
Association football midfielders
Footballers from Rio de Janeiro (city)